The 2011 LPGA Tour was a series of weekly golf tournaments for elite female golfers from around the world that began in Thailand on February 17, 2011 and had its last official event end on November 20, 2011 in Florida. The tournaments were sanctioned by the United States-based Ladies Professional Golf Association (LPGA).

Season overview
There were 23 official tournaments on the 2011 LPGA, the lowest number in nearly 40 years. More events were held outside of the United States, with eleven different countries hosting tournaments, the highest number in the history of the LPGA Tour. Thirteen tournaments were held in the United States, the lowest number in several decades.

Yani Tseng from Taiwan, was the dominant player on the 2011 Tour. She won seven of the 22 tournaments in which she played and had fourteen top-10 finishes. Her wins in the Women's British Open and the LPGA Championship made her the youngest player ever, male or female, to win five career major tournaments. She won the LPGA money list title with $2,921,713 in official earnings; American Cristie Kerr finished second with $1,470,979.

Tseng also won the Player of the Year award and the Vare Trophy given to the player with the lowest scoring average for the season. Korean Hee Kyung Seo won the Rookie of the Year award.

Changes in the 2011 season
 Three new events were announced at the start of the season: the RR Donnelley LPGA Founders Cup in Arizona in March, the Imperial Springs LPGA in China in August, and the Sunrise LPGA Taiwan Championship in October. The Imperial Springs event was postponed from early August to late September, then canceled outright on September 13.
 The new RR Donnelley LPGA Founders Cup, held in honor of the LPGA's founders, did not have a cash purse. Instead, a $1 million mock purse was awarded. This purse counted toward the players' annual money list standings, and the event carried a full points allocation toward the World Golf Rankings and LPGA season award races. The sponsor matched the $1 million purse with a donation to charity: $500,000 to LPGA-USGA Girls Golf program and $500,000 to charities of each player's choice for the top ten finishers.
 The CME Group Titleholders, the successor to the LPGA Tour Championship, had a field made up of three qualifiers from each official tour event—specifically the top three finishers who have not already qualified for the Titleholders.
 The Tres Marias Championship, scheduled for April in Mexico, was canceled in late January because of security concerns; this created a three-week gap in the LPGA schedule.
 The Jamie Farr Owens Corning Classic was not played in 2011, but will return for 2012 through 2014. The Toledo area hosted the 2011 U.S. Senior Open, a major championship on the Champions Tour.

Schedule and results
The number in parentheses after winners' names show the player's total number wins in official money individual events on the LPGA Tour, including that event.
The "Titleholders qualifiers" column indicates the three golfers at each official event who qualify for the season-ending tournament, the CME Group Titleholders.

Tournaments in bold are majors.
1Ryu was not an LPGA member at the time of her win and her win was not counted as an official LPGA win.

Season leaders
Money list leaders

Full 2011 Official Money List - navigate to "Official Money List"

Scoring average leaders

Full 2011 Scoring Average List - navigate to "Scoring Average"

See also
2011 in golf
2011 Ladies European Tour
2011 LPGA Futures Tour

References

External links
Official site

LPGA Tour seasons
Lpga Tour